The inaugural edition of Cannes International Series Festival is a television festival that took place from 4 to 11 April 2018 in Cannes, France. Danish actress Sidse Babett Knudsen served as the patron of the festival edition.

Israel-Colombian drama series When Heroes Fly won the Best Series of the festival.

Juries
The following juries were named for the festival.

Competition
Harlan Coben, American writer, Jury President
Paula Beer, German actress
Audrey Fouché, French director and screenwriter
Melisa Sözen, Turkish actress
Cristobal Tapia de Veer, Chilean-Canadian composer
Michael K. Williams, American actor

Short Form Competition
Adi Shankar, American actor
Jessica Barden, English actress
Ed Solomon, American screenwriter and director

Official selection

In competition
The following series were selected to compete:

Short Form Competition
The following series were selected to compete:

Out of competition
The following series were screened out of competition:

Awards
The following awards were presented at the festival:
Best Series: When Heroes Fly by Omri Givon
Best Screenplay: Mette Marit Bølstad for State of Happiness
Best Music: Ginge Anvik for State of Happiness
Special Interpretation Prize: Miguel by Daphna Levin and Tom Salama
Best Performance: Francesco Montanari for Cacciatore: The Hunter
Best Short Form Series: Dominos by Zoé Pelchat

Special award
The following honorary award was presented at the festival:
Variety Icon Award: Michelle Dockery

References

External links

2018 in French television